Lene Cecilia Sparrok (born 6 October 1997) is a Norwegian Southern Sámi actress.  She was the main protagonist, Elle-Marja, in the Sami 2016 film Sami Blood, for which she won a Guldbagge Award for Best Actress in a Leading Role.

Sporrok was born in Namsskogan, Nord-Trøndelag, and went to school in Snåsa. She grew up in a family that worked with reindeer herding, and has said that she will want to continue working as a reindeer herder regardless of whether she pursues acting as a career or not. She speaks Southern Sámi, Norwegian and Swedish.

References

External links

1997 births
Living people
Norwegian film actresses
Sámi actors